The Agricultural College, Bapatla was founded on 11 July 1945 by the Government of Composite Madras State India. It is the oldest of the eight Agricultural Colleges that make up Acharya N G Ranga Agricultural University, Andhra Pradesh.

History 
Sri C R Srinivasa Iyengar was its first principal.
The college was affiliated to the Andhra University in 1945. The first graduating class received their degree is 1948 from the Andhra University, Waltair. An area of 328 acres was acquired on the Bapatla – Guntur road in 1950.

The college was recognized to give a M.Sc (Ag) by research in 1951. In 1964 it became part of Andhra Pradesh Agricultural University, established with  Sri O Pulla Reddy as first Vice-Chancellor. Post-graduate programmes were started in Genetics and Plant Breeding  (1968),  Entomology and Soil Science and Agricultural Chemistry  (1970), Agricultural Economics (1976),   Plant Physiology (1978), in Agronomy and Plant Pathology (1982). An Extension division was added in 1984. Ph.D programmes in Plant Pathology, Plant Physiology and Entomology began in 1993.

M.V.Reddy was Professor and Principal (1980–83)

In 1983, a 4-year B.Tech (Agril. Engineering) degree programme was started, which became  an independent College of Agricultural Engineering in 1989; a College of Home Science was started in 1983.

Dr D.Lokanadha Reddy appointed as Associate Dean of Agricultural College bapatla on 1 September 2017.

List of meets with politician 
Loksatta party founder Jayaprakash Narayan visited this college to interact with students on 2 December 2017.

References

1945 establishments in India
Educational institutions established in 1945